Mark Steven Dempsey (born December 17, 1957) is a former Major League Baseball pitcher who played for the San Francisco Giants in .

External links
, or Retrosheet

1957 births
Living people
Baseball players from Dayton, Ohio
Glens Falls White Sox players
Great Falls Giants players
Major League Baseball pitchers
Navegantes del Magallanes players
American expatriate baseball players in Venezuela
Ohio State Buckeyes baseball players
Phoenix Giants players
San Francisco Giants players
Shreveport Captains players